Amazon is a 1990 drama that was directed by the Finnish film director Mika Kaurismäki, who co-wrote the script with Richard Reitinger and John Reaves, the latter of whom contributed additional writing. The movie premiered at the Toronto Festival of Festivals in September 1990.

While shooting the movie Kaurismäki tried to minimize the movie and crew's impact on the environment, which he tried to minimize by choosing equipment that would have the least impact on the shooting location, the surrounding areas, and its inhabitants.

Synopsis 
The film centers upon a Finnish businessman named Kari and his two daughters. The trio has gone to Brazil, where he decides to investigate the possibility of starting a gold mining operation in the nearby rainforest, urged on Dan, an American expatriate interested in entering a business arrangement with Kari. He's warned against this by a local woman, Paola, who tells him that mining would have disastrous repercussions on the jungle and its inhabitants. The two begin to fall in love and Kari starts to doubt his plans. However, before he can truly act on these concerns with his prospective business partner, Kari and Dan are involved in an airplane accident that kills Dan and leave Kari terribly wounded. He's nursed back to health by a rainforest tribe, after which he returns to his daughters and Paola.

Cast 
Kari Väänänen as Kari
Robert Davi as Dan
Rae Dawn Chong as Paola
Minna Sovio as Nina
Aili Sovio as Lea
Ruy Polanah as Julio Cesar
Pirkko Hämäläinen as Susanne
Expedito Barreira as Dealer
Luis Otavio as Money Changer
Sidney Martins as Thief
Ana Mel as Black Whore
Abimael Tosin as First Flight Customer

Reception
Critical reception has been mixed. In his review in The New York Times film critic Vincent Canby wrote that Amazon "is not the most exciting movie ever made, but it doesn't push. It is laid back. The flora and fauna are interesting and the cast is attractive." Variety was mixed, stating "Visually film is always stimulating but storytelling is wildly uneven, and director Mika Kaurismaki has an uncertain command of pic's tone. Acting is okay."

Pietari Kääpä commented upon the movie in his 2012 book Directory of World Cinema: Finland, calling it an "environmentally aware film" while also stating "In Amazon, we are made privy to a clear environmentalist argument about the need to preserve the Amazonian rainforest. But, simultaneously, it maintains many of these problematic binaries, such as humanity's exploitative relationship with nature."

Awards
Jussi Award for Best Sound Recording (1991, won)

References

External links
 

1990 films
English-language Brazilian films
English-language Finnish films
English-language German films
English-language French films
1990s Finnish-language films
1990s Portuguese-language films
Films set in Brazil
1990 drama films
American multilingual films
Finnish multilingual films
Brazilian multilingual films
American drama films
Brazilian drama films
Finnish drama films
French drama films
German drama films
1990s English-language films
1990 multilingual films
1990s American films
1990s French films
1990s German films